The Actuarial Association of Europe (AAE) was established in 1978 as Groupe Consultatif des Associations d'Actuaires des Pays des Communautés Européennes (GC), renamed to Groupe Consultatif Actuariel Européen in 2002, and given its present name on January 1, 2014.

Its purpose is to provide advice and opinions to the various organisations of the European Union – the Commission, the Council of Ministers, the European Parliament, EIOPA and their various committees – on actuarial issues in European legislation. The AAE currently has 37 member associations in 35 European countries, representing over 20,000 actuaries.  Advice and comments provided by the AAE on behalf of the European actuarial profession are totally independent of industry interests.

Member associations

Full members:
 Austrian Actuarial Society
 Institute of Actuaries of Belgium
 Bulgarian Actuarial Society
 Channel Islands Actuarial Association
 Croatian Actuarial Association
 Cyprus Association of Actuaries
 Czech Society of Actuaries
 Danish Society of Actuaries
 Estonian Actuarial Society
 Actuarial Society of Finland
 Institute of Actuaries of France
 German Actuarial Society
 Hellenic Actuarial Society (Greece)
 Hungarian Actuarial Society
 Society of Icelandic Actuaries
 Society of Actuaries in Ireland
 National Council of Actuaries (Italy)
 Italian Institute of Actuaries
 Latvian Actuarial Association
 Lithuanian Actuarial Society
 Luxembourg Actuarial Association
 Royal Actuarial Society of the Netherlands 
 Norwegian Society of Actuaries
 Polish Society of Actuaries
 Portuguese Institute of Actuaries
 Romanian Actuarial Association
 Slovak Society of Actuaries
 Slovenian Association of Actuaries
 Spanish Institute of Actuaries
 Catalan Actuarial Association (Spain - Catalunya)
 Swedish Society of Actuaries
 Swiss Association of Actuaries
 Institute and Faculty of Actuaries (United Kingdom)

Observer members:
 Malta Actuarial Society
 Actuarial Society of Turkey
 Serbian Actuarial Association
 Society of Actuaries of Ukraine

External links
  Official website of the Actuarial Association of Europe

Actuarial associations
Pan-European trade and professional organizations